Temo Mayanavanua (born 9 November 1997 in Bau (Fiji)) is a Fijian rugby union player who plays for  in the Top 14. His playing position is lock. He made his debut for Fiji in 2020 against Georgia.

Reference list

External links
itsrugby.co.uk profile

1997 births
Fijian rugby union players
Fiji international rugby union players
Living people
Rugby union locks
Northland rugby union players
Lyon OU players